Asura connexa is a moth of the family Erebidae first described by Alfred Ernest Wileman in 1910. It is endemic to Taiwan.

The wingspan is 21–22 mm.

References

connexa
Moths described in 1910
Moths of Taiwan
Endemic fauna of Taiwan